Hypselistes florens is a species of dwarf spider in the family Linyphiidae. It is found in the United States and Canada.

Subspecies
These two subspecies belong to the species Hypselistes florens:
 (Hypselistes florens florens) (O. P.-Cambridge, 1875)
 Hypselistes florens bulbiceps Chamberlin & Ivie, 1935

References

External links

 

Linyphiidae
Articles created by Qbugbot
Spiders described in 1875